Abdul-Razak Tahidu is a Ghanaian politician and member of parliament for the Chereponi constituency in the North East region of Ghana.

Early life and education 
He was born on 28 January 1977 and hails from Chereponi in the North East region of Ghana. He had his basic education in 1992 and had his SSSCE in 1995. He also had his Teacher certificate in 2000 and his Degree in Basic Education in 2007 and further had his master's degree in Leadership & Development in 2013.

Career 
He was the Budget and Examinations Officer at Ghana Education Service and later the District Chief Executive at the Ministry of Local Government for the Chereponi district.

Political career 
He is a member of NPP and currently the MP for Chereponi Constituency. He won the parliamentary seat with 19,800 votes whilst the incumbent Samuel Abdulai Jabanyite had 12,859 votes. Currently, he is a board member for the Petroleum Commission.

Committees 
He is a member of the Subsidiary Legislation Committee and also a member of the Trade, Industry and Tourism Committee.

Personal life 
Abdul-Razak is a Muslim.

References 

Ghanaian MPs 2021–2025
1977 births
New Patriotic Party politicians
Living people
Ghanaian Muslims